Afşar, Afshar, or Avşar may refer to:

People
 Afshar people, a branch of the Turkic Oghuz people
 Afshar language, the Turkic language spoken by the people above
 Afsharid dynasty, the Iranian dynasty founded by members of this people
 Afşar (surname)

Places

Afghanistan
 Afshar district, a district of Kabul

Armenia
 Avshar, Ararat, a town in the Ararat Province

Azerbaijan
 Avşar, Aghjabadi, a village and municipality in the Aghjabadi Rayon

Iran
 Afshar District, a district in Khodabandeh County, Zanjan Province
 Afshar Rural District, a rural district in West Azerbaijan Province
 Afshar, Jolfa, a village in Daran Rural District, in the Central District of Jolfa County, East Azerbaijan Province
 Afshar, Meyaneh, a village in Kaghazkonan-e Shomali Rural District, in Kaghazkonan District, Meyaneh County, East Azerbaijan Province
 Afshar-e Olya, a village in Sanjabad-e Jonubi Rural District, Firuz District, Kowsar County, Ardabil Province
 Afshar, Sistan and Baluchestan, a village in Mehrestan County, Sistan and Baluchestan Province
 Afsharlu, a village in Qeshlaqat-e Afshar Rural District, Afshar District, Khodabandeh County, Zanjan Province

Turkey
 Afşar, Bala, a town in the district of Balâ, Ankara Province
 Afşar, Bolu, a village in the district of Bolu, Bolu Province
 Afşar, Çerkeş
 Afşar, Dinar, a village in the district of Dinar, Afyonkarahisar Province
 Afşar, Elmalı, a village in the district of Elmalı, Antalya Province
 Afşar, Güdül, a village in the district of Güdül, Ankara Province
 Afşar, Kalecik, a village in the district of Kalecik, Ankara Province
 Avşar, Kargı
 Afşar, Mengen, a village in the district of Mengen, Bolu Province
 Afşar, Taşköprü, a village
 Afshar Beylik, a small principality in East Anatolia
 Afşar Dam, a dam in Manisa Province

Other uses 
 Afsar (1950 film)
 Afsar (2018 film)
 Afshar experiment, a controversial physics experiment
 Afshar Operation, a 1993 military operation in the Afshar district of Kabul, Afghanistan
 Afshar rugs, a handwoven rug style

Language and nationality disambiguation pages